Judan Ali  is an English technical director of football and former footballer and coach. Ali went on to feature for clubs Arsenal, Barcelona and Murcia in his playing career.
Ali is the first BAME British National to hold a position of technical  director for a FIFA Member Association.

Early life and career 
Ali was born in Brick Lane, Tower Hamlets, London. He is of Asian descent and at first used "Jordan" instead of his own first name due to ignorant decision makers who were not inclusive at the time when Ali struggled to break through in football. He underwent several unfruitful trials at English clubs. He was taken on by Arsenal, having a two-year stint at the club's academy. He then had a spell at the La Masia Academy of Barcelona. His experiences whilst there were eventually added to his coaching philosophy altogether. 
Ali went on to sign for Spanish outfit Murcia with whom he formed a professional career.
In 2019 his appointment as technical director for the Maldives Football Association saw Ali as the first and only BAME British National to hold a position of Technical Director for a FIFA Member Association.

Youth coaching 

In the summer of 2011, Ali assembled a team of Asian players, aged under-15, to compete in the Arsenal International Soccer Festival. The team of 16, which was selected from 20,000 hopefuls, unexpectedly won the under-15 category at the Royal Holloway University.

In March 2013, Ali was appointed Head of Elite Football Development in Taiwan. Ali and the Chinese Taipei Football Association say the aim is to implement a long-term structure to get all Taiwan's age groups to their respective world championships. Ali says he intends to qualify all the Chinese Taipei age specific football teams to World Cup Finals.

In April 2015 Ali joined the coaching staff of Kitchee SC who play in the Hong Kong Premier League.
Ali runs a non-profit all-female football academy, a pre-sports school for young girls, based in London. Ambassadors and Co-founders are Ann-Katrin Berger a German professional footballer who plays as a goalkeeper for English club Chelsea and the German national team and Jessica Carter who also plays for the England national team and Chelsea.

Professional career

FA – The COACH Bursary Scheme 
Ali is currently (on-going) partaking in the Football Association's COACH scheme aimed at professionals from under-represented groups.

FCB La Masia 
Ali  was taken under the wing of his mentor, the late Johan Cryuff where Ali studied coaching of the youth teams at La Masia, FC Barcelona.

Eastern Sports Club 
Ali coached Eastern Sports Club later on in his career who compete in the Hong Kong Premierleague

Saint Kitts & Nevis Football Association 
In April 2012, Ali was invited to train the St Kitts and Nevis men's, under-17 and under-20 National Football teams. The teams were both training for their upcoming World Cup Qualifiers.

Latvia Football Federation 
In November 2012, Ali traveled to the Latvian Football Federation to oversee the UEFA A License course for Latvian national team coaches.

IA Akranes Football Club Iceland 

In November 2012 Ali visited the Volanic Islands of Iceland to deliver his coaching sessions to Icelandic coaches.

Blackburn Rovers F.C. 

In season 2012 - 2013 English champions Blackburn Rovers FC who won the Premier League in 1995 appointed Judan Ali as their U23 and Academy coach after being invited as a 'guest' coach by the owners.

Chinese Taipei National Football Team (Taiwan) 
In March 2013, Ali was appointed head of elite football development in Taiwan.

Kitchee Sports Club 

In April 2015 Ali joined the coaching staff of Kitchee SC youth team.

National Indonesian Football Team 

In March 2016 Judan Ali was appointed the manager and head coach for the Indonesian National Army Football Team which changed their name to Persikabo 1973 who compete in the Indonesian Super League. Ali was entasked with recruiting soldiers and training them from scratch and in their first season in competing they finished in 12th position generating crowd attendances of 23,000 at home games.

Persela Lamongan Football Club 

In June 2017 Judan Ali was appointed the technical director for Persela Lamongan Football Club who compete in the Indonesian Super League.

The Football Association of Maldives (FAM) 

In December 2019 Judan Ali was appointed  as the technical director for the Football Association of Maldives on a 10 - year contract taking him to 2029.

Grays Athletic FC 

In May 2022 Judan was appointed as manager of the women's first team.

Other affiliations

Film 
His attempts to forge a career in football were, in part, the inspiration for the 2007 Bollywood film Dhan Dhana Dhan Goal. Ali was involved in casting for Bollywood movie.

Charity 
In September 2007 Ali took part in Premier League All Stars football tournament for charity representing a Chelsea team alongside celebrities Ross Kemp and Omid Djalili.

In September 2012 The UK's Anti-Racism Educational Charity Show Racism the Red Card held a charity match spearheaded by Hollywood star Tamer Hassan and Shane Richie in which Ali was involved.

He has set up orphanages for the under privileged, which he runs successfully. As an orphan himself, Ali has a passion for taking players from disadvantaged backgrounds and honing them into standout footballers, which he has successfully shown during his time so far in Asia.

Professional Female Football Academy 

The Judan Ali Football Academy was set up by Ali in 2019 with his co founders Chelsea and England defender, Jessica Carter and Ann-Katrin Berger who is the German National Team and Chelsea Goalkeeper. The academy aims to take girls from underprivileged backgrounds and to turn them into elite professional footballers

References

External links 

Living people
English footballers
Arsenal F.C. players
Footballers from the London Borough of Tower Hamlets
Association footballers not categorized by position
British people of Pakistani descent
Year of birth missing (living people)